Domett may refer to:

Alfred Domett (1811-1887), British colonial statesman and poet
William Domett (1752–1828), British admiral
, a British frigate which served in the Royal Navy from 1943 ro 1946